Erjon Mustafaj (born 29 January 1989 in Peqin) is an Albanian footballer who plays as a midfielder for KF Egnatia in the Albanian First Division.

Honours

Individual
Albanian Superliga Player of the Month (1): October 2010

References

External links
 Profile - FSHF

1989 births
Living people
People from Peqin
Albanian footballers
Association football midfielders
KS Shkumbini Peqin players
KF Teuta Durrës players
KF Butrinti players
KF Elbasani players
KS Egnatia Rrogozhinë players
Kategoria Superiore players
Kategoria e Parë players